The 1984 All-Ireland Under-21 Hurling Championship was the 21st staging of the All-Ireland Under-21 Hurling Championship since its establishment by the Gaelic Athletic Association in 1964.

Galway were the defending champions, however, they were beaten by Tipperary in the All-Ireland semi-final.

On 22 August 1984, Kilkenny won the championship following a 1-12 to 0-11 defeat of Tipperary in the All-Ireland final. This was their fourth All-Ireland title in the under-21 grade and their first in seven championship seasons.

Results

Leinster Under-21 Hurling Championship

Final

Munster Under-21 Hurling Championship

First round

Semi-finals

Final

All-Ireland Under-21 Hurling Championship

Semi-finals

Final

References

Under
All-Ireland Under-21 Hurling Championship